Lexington County is a county located in the U.S. state of South Carolina. As of the 2020 census, the population was 293,991, and the 2021 population estimate was 300,137. Its county seat and largest town is Lexington. The county was chartered in 1785 and was named in commemoration of Lexington, Massachusetts, the site of the Battle of Lexington in the American Revolutionary War. Lexington County is the sixth-largest county in South Carolina by population and is part of the Columbia, SC Metropolitan Statistical Area. It is located in the Midlands region of South Carolina.

History 
Lexington County was charted in 1785 and was named after the Battles of Lexington and Concord. The largest town and county seat is Lexington but the county is also part of the Columbia metropolitan area.

Geography

The largest body of water is Lake Murray, while other waterways include the Broad River, the Saluda River and the Congaree River. Lexington County has urban, suburban, and rural landscapes. Much of the county's urbanization is in its eastern and northeastern areas.

Climate
Lexington County averages 48 inches of rain per year; the U.S. average is 37. The average snowfall is 2 inches; the U.S. average is 25 inches. The average number of days with any measurable precipitation is 104.

On average, there are 218 sunny days per year in Lexington County. The July high is around 92 degrees and the January low is 33. The comfort index, which is based on humidity during the warmest months, is a 29 out of 100, where higher is more comfortable. The U.S. average on the comfort index is 44.

State and local protected area 
 Lake Murray Dam North Recreational Area

Major water bodies 
 Congaree River
 Lake Murray
 North Fork Edisto River
 Red Bank Creek
 Saluda River

Adjacent counties 
 Richland County - east 
 Orangeburg County - southeast
 Calhoun County - southeast
 Aiken County - southwest
 Saluda County - west
 Newberry County - northwest

Transportation

Public Transportation

Public transportation in Lexington County is provided by the COMET, or officially the Central Midlands Regional Transit Authority (CMRTA). The bus system is the main public transit system for the greater Columbia area. In Lexington County, the bus system runs in the areas of West Columbia, Cayce, Irmo, Springdale, Seven Oaks, and Harbison. Additionally, COMET offers Dial-a-ride transit (DART), which provides personalized service passengers with disabilities.

Columbia Metropolitan Airport
 

The Columbia Metropolitan Airport serves as the main airport system for the greater Columbia area. In 2018, the airport served 1,197,603 passengers with 12,324 flights. Additionally, the airport is also the regional hub for UPS Airlines, transporting 136.7 million pounds of freight/mail in 2018. The airport was named Lexington County Airport, and during World War II, trained pilots for B-25 Mitchell crews.

Interstates
 Interstate 20 travels from west to east and connects Columbia to Atlanta and Augusta in the west and Florence in the east.  It serves the nearby towns and suburbs of Pelion, Lexington, West Columbia, Sandhill, Pontiac, and Elgin.  Interstate 20 is also used by travelers heading to Myrtle Beach, although the interstate's eastern terminus is in Florence.
 Interstate 26 travels from northwest to southeast and connects the Columbia area to the other two major population centers of South Carolina: the Greenville-Spartanburg area in the northwestern part of the state and North Charleston – Charleston area in the southeastern part of the state.
 Interstate 77 begins in Lexington county and ends in Cleveland, Ohio and is frequently used by travelers on the east coast heading to or from Florida.

U.S. Routes

State Routes

Demographics

2020 census

As of the 2020 United States census, there were 293,991 people, 118,193 households, and 81,118 families residing in the county.

2010 census
As of the 2010 United States Census, there were 262,391 people, 102,733 households, and 70,952 families living in the county. The racial makeup of the county was 79.3% white, 14.3% black or African American, 1.4% Asian, 0.4% American Indian, 2.7% from other races, and 1.9% from two or more races. Those of Hispanic or Latino origin made up 5.5% of the population. In terms of ancestry, 17.2% were German, 14.0% were American, 12.5% were English, and 11.8% were Irish.

Of the 102,733 households, 34.5% had children under the age of 18 living with them, 51.4% were married couples living together, 13.0% had a female householder with no husband present, 30.9% were non-families, and 24.9% of all households were made up of individuals. The average household size was 2.53 and the average family size was 3.01. The median age was 37.9 years.

The median income for a household in the county was $52,205 and the median income for a family was $64,630. Males had a median income of $44,270 versus $34,977 for females. The per capita income for the county was $26,393. About 8.5% of families and 11.1% of the population were below the poverty line, including 15.7% of those under age 18 and 8.4% of those age 65 or over.

2000 census
As of the census of 2000, there were 216,014 people, 83,240 households, and 59,849 families living in the county.  The population density was 309 people per square mile (119/km2).  There were 90,978 housing units at an average density of 130 per square mile (50/km2).  The racial makeup of the county was 84.18% White, 12.63% Black or African American, 0.34% Native American, 1.05% Asian, 0.04% Pacific Islander, 0.79% from other races, and 0.98% from two or more races.  1.92% of the population were Hispanic or Latino of any race.

There were 83,240 households, out of which 35.50% had children under the age of 18 living with them, 56.60% were married couples living together, 11.60% had a female householder with no husband present, and 28.10% were non-families. 22.50% of all households were made up of individuals, and 6.90% had someone living alone who was 65 years of age or older.  The average household size was 2.56 and the average family size was 3.01.

In the county, the population was spread out, with 26.10% under the age of 18, 8.30% from 18 to 24, 31.60% from 25 to 44, 23.80% from 45 to 64, and 10.20% who were 65 years of age or older.  The median age was 36 years. For every 100 females, there were 94.50 males.  For every 100 females age 18 and over, there were 91.30 males.

The median income for a household in the county was $44,659, and the median income for a family was $52,637. Males had a median income of $36,435 versus $26,387 for females. The per capita income for the county was $21,063.  About 6.40% of families and 9.00% of the population were below the poverty line, including 11.10% of those under age 18 and 9.30% of those age 65 or over.

Law and government

Politics
Lexington County was one of the first areas of South Carolina to turn Republican. The last official Democratic candidate to carry the county at a presidential level was Franklin D. Roosevelt in 1944. It supported splinter Dixiecrat candidates in 1948 and 1956.

In the 2020 Presidential election, Lexington County voted 64.2% in favor of Republican Donald Trump and 34.2% in favor of Democrat Joe Biden with 72.6% of the eligible electorate voting. This was the strongest performance by a Democratic candidate for President since 1976.

The county is no less Republican at the state level. It has supported the Republican candidate for governor in every election since 1982 when Richard Riley carried every county in the state. As late as 2006, Tommy Moore did manage 44 percent of the vote. The last Democratic senatorial nominee to manage even 30 percent of the county's vote was Inez Tenenbaum in 2004, and no Democrat has carried the county since Ernest "Fritz" Hollings did so in 1980. In 1986, it was the only county in the state to support Hollings' GOP opponent Henry McMaster.

On November 4, 2014, Lexington County residents voted against a proposed sales tax increase. The money generated from this tax would have mostly been used to improve traffic conditions upon roadways. Likewise on November 4, 2014, residents voted to repeal a ban on alcohol sales on Sundays within the county.

Law enforcement
In 2015, long-time county sheriff James Metts pled guilty to charges of conspiring to harbor and conceal illegal aliens. Metts accepted bribes to keep undocumented immigrants out of federal databases. Metts had been sheriff since 1972.

Education

Attractions
 

Lake Murray
Riverbanks Zoo
Riverbanks Botanical Garden
Riverbanks Waterfall Junction and waterpark 
Lexington County Museum
Lake Murray Dam
Lexington County Baseball Stadium
Cayce-West Columbia Riverwalk
Fourteen-mile Creek Trail
Columbiana Centre

Economics
The Saxe Gotha Industrial Park near Cayce houses multiple distribution sites for major national companies, including Amazon, Chick-fil-A, and Nephron Pharmaceuticals. Near Lexington is the Michelin plant.

Top Employers

Communities

Notable person
 Floyd Spence Lexington County resident & Congressman for 30 years.

See also 
 List of counties in South Carolina
 National Register of Historic Places listings in Lexington County, South Carolina
 Birch County, South Carolina, a proposed county that would include existing portions of Lexington County

Notes

References

External links

 
 

 
1785 establishments in South Carolina
Populated places established in 1785
Columbia metropolitan area (South Carolina)